Brachystegia is a genus of tree of the subfamily Detarioideae that is native to tropical Africa.

Trees of the genus are commonly known as miombo, and are dominant in the miombo woodlands of central and southern tropical Africa. The Zambezian region is the centre of diversity for the genus.

Description
Hybridisation between the species occurs and taxa show considerable variation in leaflet size, shape and number, making identification difficult.

New leaves show a great range of red colours when immature, later turning to various shades of green.

Species

 Brachystegia allenii
 Brachystegia angustistipulata
 Brachystegia bakeriana
 Brachystegia bequaertii
 Brachystegia boehmii
 Brachystegia bussei
 Brachystegia cynometroides
 Brachystegia eurycoma
 Brachystegia floribunda
 Brachystegia glaberrima
 Brachystegia glaucescens
 Brachystegia gossweileri
 Brachystegia kalongensis
 Brachystegia kennedyi
 Brachystegia laurentii
 Brachystegia leonensis
 Brachystegia longifolia
 Brachystegia luishiensis
 Brachystegia lujae
 Brachystegia manga
 Brachystegia microphylla
 Brachystegia mildbraedii
 Brachystegia nigerica
 Brachystegia puberula
 Brachystegia russelliae
 Brachystegia spiciformis
 Brachystegia stipulata
 Brachystegia subfalcato
 Brachystegia tamarindoides
 Brachystegia taxifolia
 Brachystegia torrei
 Brachystegia utilis
 Brachystegia wangermeeana
 Brachystegia zenkeri

See also

References

External links

 
Trees of Africa
Flora of South Tropical Africa
Flora of West-Central Tropical Africa
Miombo
Fabaceae genera